The United States Senate Committee on Health, Education, Labor and Pensions (HELP) generally considers matters relating to these issues. Its jurisdiction also extends beyond these issues to include several more specific areas, as defined by Senate rules.

While currently known as the HELP Committee, the committee was originally founded on January 28, 1869, as the Committee on Education. Its name was changed to the Committee on Education and Labor on February 14, 1870, when petitions relating to labor were transferred to its jurisdiction from the Committee on Naval Affairs.

The committee’s jurisdiction at the end of the 19th and early 20th centuries focused largely on issues relating to federal employees’ working conditions and federal education aid. Prominent action considered by the committee in the 1910s and 1920s included the creation of a national minimum wage, the establishments of a Department of Labor, a Department of Education, and a Children’s Bureau. During the 1930s, the committee took action on the National Labor Relations Act, the Walsh-Healey Public Contracts Act of 1936 and the Fair Labor Standards Act of 1938.

In 1944, the jurisdiction of the Public Health Service was transferred from the Commerce Committee to the Committee on Education and Labor, adding issues relating to public health matters to its jurisdiction. The committee's name was changed during the 80th Congress to the Committee on Labor and Public Welfare as part of the Legislative Reorganization Act of 1946 (Public Law 79-601). The act further expanded the committee's oversight to include the rehabilitation, health, and education of veterans. Mine safety was also added to the committee’s jurisdiction in 1949.

During the Administration of President Lyndon B. Johnson, the committee took the lead in shaping legislation as part of Johnson's War on Poverty, resulting in the Economic Opportunity Act of 1964. Through the Legislative Reorganization Act of 1970 (Public Law 91-510), certain issues pertaining to veterans were transferred to the newly created Committee on Veterans Affairs. In the 95th Congress, the Senate passed S. Res. 4, which renamed the committee to be the Committee on Human Resources. However, the name was again changed in the 96th Congress by S. Res. 30 to the Committee on Labor and Human Resources. On March 18, 1992, the committee’s jurisdiction was updated to include all of the areas listed below. The committee was given its current name, the Committee on Health, Education, Labor and Pensions, on January 19, 1999, by S. Res. 20.

Jurisdictional areas 
Under the Rule 25 of the Standing Rules of the Senate, the following subject matters fall under the jurisdiction of the Committee.
Measures relating to education, labor, health, and public welfare
Aging
Agricultural colleges
Arts and humanities
Biomedical research and development
Child labor
Convict labor and the entry of goods made by convicts into interstate commerce
Domestic activities of the American Red Cross
Equal employment opportunity
Gallaudet University, Howard University, and St. Elizabeths Hospital in Washington, D.C.
Individuals with disabilities
Labor standards and labor statistics
Mediation and arbitration of labor disputes
Occupational Safety and Health Administration, including the welfare of miners.
Mine Safety and Health Administration
Private pension plans
Public health
Railway labor and retirement
Regulation of foreign laborers
Student loans
Wages and hours of labor, including the federal minimum wage

Members, 118th Congress

Subcommittees

Historical members

110th Congress

111th Congress  
The Committee was chaired by Democrat Ted Kennedy of Massachusetts until his death on August 25, 2009. Under seniority rules, Acting Chairman Christopher Dodd was next in line, but Dodd chose instead to remain chairman of the Senate Banking Committee. Tom Harkin, next in line by seniority, assumed the chairmanship on September 9, 2009, vacating his post as chairman of the Senate Agriculture Committee. Republican Mike Enzi of Wyoming continued to serve as Ranking Member.

Source: ,

112th Congress 

Source:

113th Congress 

Source:  to 297

114th Congress 

Source 

Source:  to 68

115th Congress

116th Congress

117th Congress

Defunct subcommittees 
The committee has had other subcommittees in the past, such as:
 the Subcommittee on Migratory Labor during the 1950s through 1970s.
 the Subcommittee on Health and Scientific Research during the 1970s.
 the Subcommittee Investigating Violations of Free Speech and the Rights of Labor, informally known as the "La Follette Civil Liberties Committee"

Chairpersons

Education 1869–1870 
James Harlan (R-IA) 1869
Charles D. Drake (R-MO) 1869–1870

Education and Labor, 1870 – 1947  
Frederick Sawyer (R-SC) 1870–1873
James W. Flanagan (R-TX) 1873–1875
Orris S. Ferry (R-CT) 1875
John J. Patterson (R-SC) 1875–1877
Ambrose Burnside (R-RI) 1877–1879
James E. Bailey (D-TN) 1879–1881
Henry W. Blair (R-NH) 1881–1891
Joseph M. Carey (R-WY) 1891–1893
James H. Kyle (PO-SD) 1893–1895
George Shoup (R-ID) 1895–1897
James H. Kyle (PO-SD) 1897–1901
Louis McComas (R-MD) 1901–1905
Boies Penrose (R-PA) 1905
Jonathan P. Dolliver (R-IA) 1905–1909
William E. Borah (R-ID) 1909–1913
Hoke Smith (D-GA) 1913–1919
William S. Kenyon (R-IA) 1919–1922
William E. Borah (R-ID) 1922–1924
Lawrence C. Phipps (R-CO) 1924–1926
James Couzens (R-MI) 1926–1929
Jesse H. Metcalf (R-RI) 1929–1933
David I. Walsh (D-MA) 1933–1937
Hugo L. Black (D-AL) 1937
Elbert D. Thomas (D-UT) 1937–1945
James E. Murray (D-MT) 1945–1947

Labor and Public Welfare, 1947–1977 
Robert A. Taft (R-OH) 1947–1949
Elbert D. Thomas (D-UT) 1949–1951
James E. Murray (D-MT) 1951–1953
H. Alexander Smith (R-NJ) 1953–1955
Lister Hill (D-AL) 1955–1969
Ralph Yarborough (D-TX) 1969–1971
Harrison A. Williams, Jr. (D-NJ) 1971–1977

Human Resources, 1977–1979 
Harrison A. Williams, Jr. (D-NJ) 1977–1979

Labor and Human Resources, 1979–1999 
Harrison A. Williams, Jr. (D-NJ) 1979–1981
Orrin G. Hatch (R-UT) 1981–1987
Ted Kennedy (D-MA) 1987–1995
Nancy Kassebaum (R-KS) 1995–1997
James M. Jeffords (R-VT) 1997–1999

Health, Education, Labor and Pensions, 1999–present 
James M. Jeffords (R-VT) 1999–2001
Ted Kennedy (D-MA) 2001
James M. Jeffords (R-VT) 2001
Ted Kennedy (D-MA) 2001–2003
Judd Gregg (R-NH) 2003–2005
Michael Enzi (R-WY) 2005–2007
Ted Kennedy (D-MA) 2007–2009
Chris Dodd (D-CT) 2009, acting
Tom Harkin (D-IA) 2009–2015
Lamar Alexander (R-TN) 2015–2021
Patty Murray (D-WA) 2021–2023
Bernie Sanders (I-VT) 2023–present

See also 
 List of current United States Senate committees
 Health education

References

External links 
 Official Committee Page (Archive)
 Senate Health, Education, Labor and Pensions Committee. Legislation activity and reports, Congress.gov.

Health, Education, Labor and Pensions
Health in the United States
Education in the United States
Retirement in the United States
1869 establishments in the United States
Labor in the United States
Parliamentary committees on Healthcare